Kərimbəyli or Kerimbeyli may refer to:
Kərimbəyli, Barda, Azerbaijan
Kərimbəyli, Fizuli, Azerbaijan
Kərimbəyli, Babek, Nakhchivan, Azerbaijan
Kərimbəyli, Sharur, Nakhchivan, Azerbaijan
Kərimbəyli, Salyan, Azerbaijan